Tangihanga, or more commonly, tangi, is a traditional Māori funeral rite held on a marae. While still widely practised, it is not universally observed in modern times.

Each iwi (tribe/nation) differs on how they honour those who pass. Tangihanga generally take three days with burial on the third day. The  is transported (usually from a hospital and via a funeral home) to the marae.

Around the coffin, flowers and photographs of deceased relatives are placed.

Visitors come during the day, sometimes from great distances despite only a distant relationship, to address the deceased. They may speak frankly of his or her faults as well as virtues, but singing and joking are also appropriate. Free expression of grief by both men and women is encouraged. The close kin may not speak. It is traditional for mourners to wash their hands in water and sprinkle some on their heads before leaving the area where the tūpāpaku lies in state. Traditionally, the visitors would bring famous taonga (treasures), such as kākā and kiwi feather-cloaks and pounamu mere, which would be placed alongside the tūpāpaku. These items were inherited by the heirs of the deceased, who were then expected to return them to the original owners at subsequent tangihanga. This practice was called kōpaki.

As with the area the  lies, it is traditional for mourners to wash their hands in water and sprinkle some on their heads before leaving the cemetery. Mourners are expected to provide  or gifts towards the meal. The widow or widower is not left alone for several nights following.

Both in traditional times and modern, the tangi of high-profile individuals can be both extended and elaborate.

A 2011 court case ruled that funeral traditions do not over-rule common law.

References

Māori culture
Funerals
Death in New Zealand